Mapletree Investments Pte Ltd is a real estate development, investment, capital and property management company headquartered in Singapore. The Group currently manages three Singapore-listed real estate investment trusts (REITs) and seven private equity real estate funds, which comprise a diverse portfolio of assets in Asia Pacific, Europe, the United Kingdom (UK) and the United States (US).

Introduction
On 7 December 2000, PSA Corporation formed The HarbourFront Ltd to transfer its non-port properties to Temasek Holdings. Mapletree Investments Pte Ltd was later formed on 18 December 2000.

Mapletree owns and manages S$78.7 billion of office, logistics, industrial, data centre, residential, student accommodation, multifamily/ serviced apartment and retail/lifestyle properties at the end of FY2021/2022. The properties are located across 13 markets globally. 

The group has offices in Singapore, China, Hong Kong SAR, Australia, India, Japan, Malaysia, South Korea, Poland, The Netherlands, Vietnam, UK and US. Mapletree's property portfolio includes projects in Singapore such as VivoCity, Mapletree Business City, and Saigon South Place in Ho Chi Minh City, Vietnam.

Real estate investment trusts 
Mapletree manages three real estate investment trusts that are listed on the Singapore Exchange:
 Mapletree Logistics Trust (MLT)
 Mapletree Industrial Trust (MIT)
 Mapletree Pan Asia Commercial Trust (MPACT)

Private real estate funds 
Mapletree currently manages seven private real estate funds:
 Mapletree Global Student Accommodation Private Trust (MGSA)
 Mapletree US & EU Logistics Private Trust (MUSEL)
 Mapletree Australia Commercial Private Trust (MASCOT)
 Mapletree Europe Income Trust (MERIT)
 Mapletree US Income Commercial Trust (MUSIC)
 Mapletree US Logistics Private Trust (MUSLOG)
 Mapletree China Logistics Investment Private Fund (MCLIP)

References

External links
 Mapletree Investments

2000 establishments in Singapore
Real estate companies of Singapore
Singaporean brands
Singaporean companies established in 2000
Real estate companies established in 2000